Nimislyarovo (Nimeslär) is a rural locality (a selo) in Novokulevsky Selsoviet, Nurimanovsky District, Bashkortostan, Russia. The population was 691 as of 2010. There are 11 streets.

Geography 
Nimislyarovo is located 18 km southwest of Krasnaya Gorka (the district's administrative centre) by road. Novokulevo is the nearest rural locality.

References 

Rural localities in Nurimanovsky District